Sara Topham (born 1976) is a Canadian actress. She is primarily associated with stage roles at the Stratford Shakespeare Festival in Ontario, Canada.

Background
Sara Topham was born and raised in Victoria, British Columbia, Canada, in 1976. She graduated from drama school at the University of Victoria in 1998.

Stratford Shakespeare Festival credits
Topham has played several major stage roles over the course of 13 years (2000 to 2011 and 2013) at the Stratford Shakespeare Festival, specializing in -type figures in comedies and also sensitive and vulnerable types in dramas.

 Henry V (2001) by William Shakespeare – Princess Katherine
 All's Well That Ends Well (2002) by William Shakespeare – Diana
 Henry IV, Part 1 (2002) by William Shakespeare – Lady Mortimer
 Agamemnon (2003) by Aeschylus – Cassandra
 The Swanne: Princess Charlotte (The Acts of Venus) (2003) by Peter Hinton – Dot
 Noises Off (2004) by Michael Frayn – Brooke Ashton
 Henry VIII (2004) by William Shakespeare – Anne Bullen
 As You Like It (2005) by William Shakespeare – Rosalind
 The Glass Menagerie (2006) by Tennessee Williams – Laura
 The Merchant of Venice (2006) by William Shakespeare – Jessica
 London Assurance (2006) by Dion Boucicault – Grace
 King Lear (2007) by William Shakespeare – Cordelia
 An Ideal Husband (2007) by Oscar Wilde – Mabel
 Fuente Ovejuna (2008) by Lope de Vega – Laurencia
 The Importance of Being Earnest (2009) by Oscar Wilde – Gwendolen
 Peter Pan (2010) by J. M. Barrie – Wendy
 Dangerous Liaisons (2010) by Christopher Hampton – Présidente de Tourvel
 Twelfth Night (2011) by William Shakespeare – Olivia
 The Misanthrope (2011) by Molière – Célimène
 Blithe Spirit (2013) by Noël Coward – Ruth
 Romeo and Juliet (2013) by William Shakespeare – Juliet

Broadway theatre credits
 The Importance of Being Earnest (2010–2011) by Oscar Wilde, American Airlines Theatre, 13 January 2011 – 26 June 2011, Gwendolen
 Thérèse Raquin (2015) adaptation by Helen Edmundson, Roundabout Theater at Studio 54, October–November 2015, minor roles and understudy Thérèse Raquin
 Travesties (2018) by Tom Stoppard, American Airlines Theatre, April–June 2018, Cecily
 Leopoldstadt (2022–2023) by Tom Stoppard, Longacre Theatre, October 2022 – July 2023, Jana, Sally, and understudies

Roles in other companies
Topham played Titania and Hippolyta in A Midsummer Night's Dream by Shakespeare at the Shakespeare Theatre Company (2012), Cecily in Travesties by Tom Stoppard at the McCarter Theatre (2012), Miranda in The Tempest by Shakespeare at the Hartford Stage (2012), Gwendolyn in The Importance of Being Earnest at the Roundabout Theatre Company on Broadway (2012), the Governess in The Turn of the Screw by Jeffrey Hatcher adapted from Henry James at the Belfry Theatre (2008), Constanze in Amadeus by Peter Shaffer at Theatre Aquarius, and Mary Hatch in It's a Wonderful Life adapted for the stage at The Grand Theatre in London, Ontario, Canada.

Movies
In addition to film adaptations of Twelfth Night (2012) and The Importance of Being Earnest (2011), Topham played Rachel Peabody in Disney's Eloise at Christmastime (2003) and Anna in Dying to Dance (2001).

References

External links
 
 
 
 
 
 
 

Canadian stage actresses
Canadian film actresses
Living people
Actresses from Victoria, British Columbia
University of Victoria alumni
1976 births